Manuel Lora-Tamayo Martín (21 January 1904 – 22 July 2002) was a Spanish politician who served as Minister of National Education of Spain (later renamed as Education and Science) between 1962 and 1968, during the Francoist dictatorship.

References

1904 births
2002 deaths
Education ministers of Spain
Government ministers during the Francoist dictatorship